Hofmeier is a surname of German origin, being a variant of the surname Hofmeyer. Notable people with the surname include:

Markus Hofmeier (1993), German footballer
Max Hofmeier (1854-1927), German gynecologist

See also
Winterhalder & Hofmeier, a German clock manufacturing company
Hofmeyr (surname)
Hoffmeier
Homeier